Henry Hubbard (May 3, 1784June 5, 1857) was a member of the United States House of Representatives from 1829 to 1835, a Senator from New Hampshire during 1835 to 1841, and the 18th governor of New Hampshire from 1842 to 1844.

Early life
Henry Hubbard was born on May 3, 1784, in Charlestown, New Hampshire in the United States.  Hubbard was educated at home, and engaged in classical studies whilst taught by private tutors, before attending Dartmouth College and graduating from there in 1803.  He studied law in Portsmouth with Jeremiah Mason, and was admitted to the New Hampshire bar around 1806.  That year, he began practicing law in Charlestown.  Hubbard married Sally Walker Dean in 1813; together, they would have 5 children. In 1818, Hubbard purchased 50 shares of the Suffolk Bank, a clearinghouse bank on State Street in Boston.

Political career
In 1810, Hubbard entered politics for the first time, and was elected to the position of Town Moderator; by the end of his life, he would be elected Town Moderator sixteen times.  In 1812, Hubbard became a member of the New Hampshire House of Representatives, and served until 1814, as well as from 1819 to 1820, and 1823 to 1827.  From 1825 to 1827, he was the Speaker of the House.  Hubbard was also selectman in 1819, 1820 and 1828, the Judge Advocate of the 5th Militia Brigade, the Solicitor for Sullivan County from 1823 to 1828 as well as the state solicitor for Cheshire County during that time, and Probate Judge for Sullivan County beginning in 1827 and ending in 1829.

Early on, Hubbard was a Federalist, but on March 4, 1829, he started as a member of the United States House of Representatives, as a Jackson Democrat.  He served during the 21st, 22nd, and 23rd Congresses; in the 22nd, he was the chairman of the Committee on Revolutionary Pensions.  Hubbard was also the Speaker pro tem in 1834, and he left the House on March 3, 1835, having been elected to the United States Senate as a Democrat.  During the 24th, 25th, and 26th Congresses, Hubbard held the position of chairman of the Committee on Claims.  He ended his career in the Senate on March 3, 1841.  Hubbard gained the Democratic nomination for Governor of New Hampshire, and was elected by popular vote in 1842, winning re-election in 1843.  As Governor, Hubbard "favored lowering high national protective tariffs, denounced capital punishment, and called for state legislation to curb corporate shareholder profits made at the public expense."  He also argued that women who owned property should be given a tax reduction.

Later life
Hubbard was the subtreasurer in Boston from 1846 to 1849, afterwards returning to Charlestown to practice law.  He died there on June 5, 1857, and was interred in Forest Hill Cemetery.

Footnotes

Sources

1784 births
1857 deaths
New Hampshire state court judges
Democratic Party members of the New Hampshire House of Representatives
Democratic Party governors of New Hampshire
Speakers of the New Hampshire House of Representatives
Dartmouth College alumni
American Unitarians
New Hampshire Federalists
Democratic Party United States senators from New Hampshire
People from Charlestown, New Hampshire
Jacksonian members of the United States House of Representatives from New Hampshire
Democratic Party members of the United States House of Representatives from New Hampshire
19th-century American politicians